Hearts is the debut studio album by Swedish duo I Break Horses. It was released in August 2011 by Bella Union.

Track listing
All songs written by Maria Lindén (music) and Fredrik Balck (lyrics).

Credits
Musicians
Maria Lindén – vocals, guitars, bass, keyboards, piano
Fredrik Balck – drums, percussion
Jukka Rintamäki – bass, vocals, additional keyboards, guitars, percussion
Patrik Johansson Bay – additional guitars
Patrick Alvarsson – additional guitars, treatments, percussion
Anders Gustafsson – drums (tracks 1 and 5)
Sebastian Forslund – drums (track 6)
Simon Raymonde – treatments (track 9)

Technical
Produced by Maria Lindén
Additional production by Jukka Rintamäki (tracks 1, 3, 5 and 7) and Patrick Alvarsson (tracks 6 and 8)
Mixed and mastered by Hans Olsson Brookes

Visual
Art direction by Vaughan Oliver
Design by Vaughan Oliver, Brian Whitehead and Tom Skipp
Illustrations by Vaughan Oliver, Marc Atkins and Terry Dowling

References

2011 debut albums
Bella Union albums
I Break Horses albums